The district of La Yarada Los Palos is one of the 11 districts that constitute the province of Tacna in the Tacna Region, in the south of Peru.

History 
On November 7, 2015, the President of Peru promulgated Law No. 30358, law creating the district of Yarada los Palos. The territorial limits of the district were defined as follows:

Chile protested against the creation of the district due to the dispute between both countries, and declared it null and void in the context of the border between both states.

See also 
 Tacna Departament
 Territorial organisation of Peru
 Chilean–Peruvian territorial dispute

References

External links 
 Portal of the Congress of the Republic
 INEI Peru

Districts of the Tacna Province